The 2021–22 season was the first in the history of Macclesfield Football Club. Alongside the North West Counties Premier League, they entered the FA Cup, FA Vase, NWCFL Challenge Cup and the Cheshire Senior Cup. The season covers the period from July 2021 to 30 June 2022.

On 12 March 2022, Macclesfield secured the championship and promotion to the NPL Division One following a 4–0 home win over Ashton Athletic.

Pre-season friendlies

Competitions

NWCFL Premier Division

League table

Results summary

Results by matchday

Matches
Macclesfield's league fixtures for the first half of the season were announced on 2 July 2021. The fixtures for the second half of the season were announced on 28 September 2021.

FA Cup

Macclesfield were drawn at home to Burscough in the extra preliminary round and away to Squires Gate in the preliminary round.

FA Vase 

Macclesfield were drawn away to Winterton Rangers in the first qualifying round.

NWCFL Challenge Cup 
Macclesfield were drawn away to Skelmersdale United in the quarter final, the match was later switched to the Leasing.com Stadium at Skelmersdale's request.

Cheshire Senior Cup

References

External links

Macclesfield F.C. seasons